Yerik is a rural locality (a selo) and the administrative center of Yerikovskoye Rural Settlement, Belgorodsky District, Belgorod Oblast, Russia. The population was 559 as of 2010. There are 65 streets.

Geography 
Yerik is located 28 km north of Maysky (the district's administrative centre) by road. Gonki is the nearest rural locality.

References 

Rural localities in Belgorodsky District